Oleg Shelestenko (born October 6, 1972) is a Ukrainian-born Spanish sprint canoer who competed in the mid-1990s. At the 1996 Summer Olympics in Atlanta, he finished seventh in the C-2 500 m event and eighth in the C-2 1000 m event.

References
Sports-Reference.com profile

1967 births
Canoeists at the 1996 Summer Olympics
Living people
Olympic canoeists of Spain
Spanish male canoeists